The discography of American musician and singer Esperanza Spalding includes 8 studio albums, 11 guest appearances, and 20 music videos.

Albums

EPs

Singles

Guest appearances

Music videos

References

Jazz discographies
Discographies of American artists